Feel is the first album released by Polish pop rock band Feel. The album earned Diamond certification in Poland.

Track listing 
"A gdy jest już ciemno"
"No pokaż na co cię stać"
"W odpowiedzi na twój list"
"W ciemną noc"
"Jak anioła głos"
"To długa rzeka"
"Nasze słowa, nasze dni"
"Paul"
"Ale kiedy przy mnie śpisz"
"To jest taka gra"
"Sweet Harmony"

References 

2007 debut albums